Kirillov (masculine) or Kirillova (feminine) is a Russian surname that is derived from the masculine given names Kir or Kirill. It is shared by the following notable people:
Alexandre Kirillov (born 1936), Russian mathematician
Alexander Kirillov, Jr., his son, Russian-American mathematician
Anastasia Kirillova (born 1996), Belarusian cross-country skier
Boris Kirillov (born 1992), Azerbaijani swimmer
Dayana Kirillova (born 2002), Russian singer
Dmitri Kirillov (born 1998), Russian football player
Dmitry Kirillov (curler) (born 1968), Belarusian curler and curling coach
Ekaterina Kirillova (born 1973), Belarusian curler 
Elena Kirillova (born 1986), Russian basketball player
Evgeny Kirillov (born 1987), Russian tennis player
Faina Kirillova (born 1931), Belarusian mathematician
Igor Kirillov (1932-2021), Soviet and Russian television presenter and announcer
Irina Kirillova (born 1965), Soviet Olympic volleyball player
Pyotr Kirillov (1910–1955), Mordvin Soviet writer
Sergei Kirillov (born 1960), Russian artist
Vadim Kirillov (born 1964), Soviet football player and coach
Vladimir Kirillov (1889–1943), Russian/Soviet poet
Vyacheslav Kirillov (born 1989), Russian football player
Yelpidifor Kirillov (1883–1964), Soviet physicist
Yuri Kirillov (born 1990), Russian football player

In fiction
Alexei Nilych Kirillov, hero of Demons (Dostoyevsky novel).

See also
Kirilov
Kirillovsky (disambiguation)

References

Russian-language surnames
Patronymic surnames
Surnames from given names